Parmouti 18 - Coptic Calendar - Parmouti 20

The nineteenth day of the Coptic month of Parmouti, the eighth month of the Coptic year. In common years, this day corresponds to April 14, of the Julian Calendar, and April 27, of the Gregorian Calendar. This day falls in the Coptic Season of Shemu, the season of the Harvest.

Commemorations

Martyrs 

 The martyrdom of Saint Simeon the Armenian, Bishop of Persia 
 The martyrdom of Saint John Abu Nagaah El-Kebeer 
 The martyrdom of the vizier Saint Abu Elaala Fahd ibn Ibrahim, and his companions 
 The martyrdom of the monk Saint David ibn Ghobrial el-Bargy

References 

Days of the Coptic calendar